Route nationale 8 (RN 8) is a secondary highway in Madagascar of 198 km, running from Morondava to Bekopaka. Only the first 15km are paved, the remaining is unpaved. It crosses the regions of Menabe and Melaky Region.

Selected locations on route
(south to north)
Morondava - (intersection with RN 35  to Ambositra)
Belo-sur-Tsiribihina
Manambolo River ferry
Bekopaka

See also
List of roads in Madagascar
Transport in Madagascar

References

Roads in Melaky
Roads in Menabe
Roads in Madagascar